Brett Olson (born February 19, 1987) is an American former professional ice hockey centre. He most notably played in the American Hockey League (AHL) and the Deutsche Eishockey Liga (DEL).

Playing career

College
Prior to turning professional, Olson attended the Michigan Technological University where he played four seasons (2008–12) of NCAA Division I hockey with the Michigan Tech Huskies, where he registered 42 goals, 51 assists, 93 points, and 156 penalty minutes, in 127 games.  Olson  was named to the WCHA All-Academic team in both 2011 and 2012, and served as captain during his senior year.

Professional
Following his graduation, Olson played professional hockey in the American Hockey League (AHL) with the Abbotsford Heat for the 2012–13  and 2013–14 AHL seasons.

On July 4, 2014, the Florida Panthers of the National Hockey League (NHL) signed Olson to a one-year, two-way contract, and he played the  2014–15 season with the Panthers' AHL affiliate, the San Antonio Rampage.

On May 28, 2015, the Florida Panthers re-signed Olson to another one-year contract. Olsen suffered a dip in production with new Panthers' AHL affiliate, the Portland Pirates during the 2015–16 season. In 67 games, he contributed with 13 goals and 26 points.

As a free agent from the Panthers in the off-season, Olson left North America, signing a one-year deal with reigning Austrian champions, EC Red Bull Salzburg of the EBEL on July 15, 2016. Olson demonstrated his versatility throughout the 2016-17 season with Salzburg, scoring 38 points in 39 games while playing in all situations defensively with the club.

On May 28, 2017, Olson opted to sign in the Neighbouring DEL, agreeing to a one-year deal with German club, ERC Ingolstadt. On February 3, Olson scored the goal of the month by batting the puck out of mid-air from his defensive zone into the opposing team's net in the game against the Grizzly Adams Wolfsburg.

Olson played three seasons in Ingolstadt before leaving as a free agent to sign a one-year contract with Krefeld Pinguine on December 2, 2020.

Career statistics

Awards and honors

References

External links

1987 births
Abbotsford Heat players
American men's ice hockey centers
Düsseldorfer EG players
ERC Ingolstadt players
Krefeld Pinguine players
Living people
Michigan Tech Huskies men's ice hockey players
Portland Pirates players
EC Red Bull Salzburg players
San Antonio Rampage players
Sioux City Musketeers players
Waterloo Black Hawks players